Pleasant Valley is a small locality near the town of Geraldine in the Canterbury Region of the South Island of New Zealand. The area is boarded by the Geraldine Downs to the north and Gapes Valley to the south.  The Hae Hae Te Moana River runs through the valley.

History 
Originally Pleasant Valley was part of the Raukapuka estate, farmed by Alfred Cox.  The region grew with the rise of the timber industry and was up until the 1880s larger than nearby Geraldine.  In its heyday the valley was home to a blacksmith, innkeepers, a joiner and merchants amongst others, all of which have long left.  The school was original built in 1875 though moved, then destroyed by flood in 1868 and celebrated 85 years in 1960.  The school still stands today. The area was also held a number of horse races.

The Pleasant Valley Hall was built in 1922.

Notable landmarks

The  Geraldine Cheese, Butter and Bacon Factory, built in 1884, is the oldest existing dairy factory in New Zealand.  The factory was closed but subsequently reopened several times finally ceasing production in 1959 as the Geraldine Co-operative Dairy Company.  The factory still stands today as a Heritage New Zealand (NZHPT) Category II Heritage Building on private land.

St. Anne's Church, built in 1863, is the oldest church in South Canterbury and one of the oldest in the Anglican Diocese of Christchurch.  The church which was constructed with local timber is listed as a NZHPT Category II Heritage Building, and includes a stained glass window made by Veronica Whall.  Church services are still held at the church and it celebrated its 150th anniversary in 2013.

Economy 
The local economy these days is driven by farming in the region.  There is also a well-established daffodil farm, and local fruit producers Barkers.

References 

Timaru District
Populated places in Canterbury, New Zealand